The Venezuela national badminton team represents Venezuela in international badminton team competitions. It is controlled by the Venezuelan Badminton Association, the governing body for Venezuelan badminton. The Venezuelan junior team have competed in the BWF World Junior Championships mixed team event, which is also called the Suhandinata Cup.

The Venezuelan team also competed in the South American Games. The nation won a bronze in mixed doubles at the 2018 South American Games.

Participation in BWF competitions 
Suhandinata Cup

Participation in South American Games

List of medalists

Current squad 

Male players
 Frank Barrios
 Joiser Calanche
 Jesús Sánchez
 Alexander Hernandez

Female players
 Daibelis Mendoza
 Damaris Ortiz
 Tiffany Sánchez
 Michelle Martínez

References 

Badminton
National badminton teams